Abbottina liaoningensis is a species of ray-finned fish in the genus Abbottina found in the Liaoning Province of China.

References

External links
 

Abbottina
Fish described in 1987
Fish of Asia
Freshwater fish of China